The monotypic genus Yabea contains the single species Yabea microcarpa, which is known by the common names California hedge parsley and false carrot. It is similar in appearance to other species of wild carrot and relatives. It is native to western North America, including the western United States, British Columbia and Baja California. It grows in many types of habitat.

In Baja California, this species is mostly found in the northwestern part of the state, but it does range into the Central Desert. It is also found on Guadalupe Island in the Pacific Ocean.

References

External links
 Jepson Manual Treatment
 USDA Plants Profile
 The Nature Conservancy species account
 Photo gallery

Apioideae
Flora of the Western United States
Flora of British Columbia
Flora of Baja California
Flora of Mexican Pacific Islands
Monotypic Apioideae genera